The first 1931 All-Ireland Senior Hurling Championship Final took place on 6 September 1931 at Croke Park, Dublin.  It was the 44th All-Ireland final and was contested by Cork and Kilkenny.  The match ended in a 1-5 apiece draw.  The replay took place at the same venue five weeks later on 11 October 1931.  Once again, the sides finished level with both scoring 2-5.  An unprecedented second replay took place on 1 November 1931.  On that occasion the Leinster champions lost to their Munster opponents on a score line of 5-8 to 3-4.

Match details

First game

MATCH RULES
60 minutes.
Replay if scores level.
Three named substitutes

Replay

MATCH RULES
60 minutes.
Replay if scores level.
Three named substitutes

Second replay

MATCH RULES
60 minutes.
Replay if scores level.
Three named substitutes

1
All-Ireland Senior Hurling Championship Finals
Cork county hurling team matches
Kilkenny GAA matches
All-Ireland Senior Hurling Championship Final
All-Ireland Senior Hurling Championship Final
All-Ireland Senior Hurling Championship Final
All-Ireland Senior Hurling Championship Final, 1931